Liber de similitudinibus et exemplis (also known as Tabula exemplorum) is a 13th-century Latin collection of moral tales and proverbial wisdom, arranged in alphabetical order of topics, beginning with accidia (laziness) and ending with Xristi ascensio (the ascension of Christ).

Bibliography
J. Th. Welter, La Tabula exemplorum secundum ordinem alphabeti: recueil d'exempla compile en France a la fin du XIIIe siecle. Paris, 1926. [Selections in Latin]
Lynn Thorndike, "Liber de similitudinibus et exemplis (MS. Berne 293, fols 1r-75v)" in Speculum vol. 32 (1957) pp. 780-791.

13th-century Latin books